A list of films produced in the Soviet Union in 1925 (see 1925 in film).

1925

See also
 1925 in the Soviet Union

External links
 Soviet films of 1925 at the Internet Movie Database

1925
Soviet
Films